James Wallace is an American basketball coach who is currently the head coach of LeTourneau YellowJackets of which was under the bracket NCAA Division III.

College career 
Wallace played for two different college or university in his tertiary level education. The first one, he played for Western Nebraska Community College wherein he played until his sophomore season when he transferred to Southwest Minnesota State University in his junior season before an injury derailed his eventual playing career.

Coaching career 
As an assistant coach for LeTourneau YellowJackets, he won the 2019–20 ASC championship.

On April 27, 2021, he was promoted and subsequently accepted the head coaching job for the YellowJackets.

Head Coaching Record 
As of June 26, 2022

|-
| align="left" |LeTourneau YellowJackets
| align="left" |2021-22
|27||22||5||.8148 || align="center"| 
|-class="sortbottom"
| align="center" colspan=2|Career||27|||22|||5||.8148||

References

External links
James Wallace coaching profile at LeTourneau University

Living people
1989 births
American men's basketball coaches
American men's basketball players
Basketball coaches from Nebraska
Basketball players from Nebraska
Basketball coaches from Texas
Point guards